Abbeyford Leisure has been operating holiday parks for over 50 years. With award-winning holiday parks across coastal Fife in Scotland, the company has been listed among the top performing firms in the ‘London Stock Exchange 1000 Companies to Inspire Britain’.

Abbeyford Leisure Holiday Parks
 Elie Holiday Park, Fife, Scotland
 St Andrews Holiday Park, Fife, Scotland
 St Monans Holiday Park, Fife, Scotland

References

Leisure companies of the United Kingdom